Senlac Hill (or Senlac Ridge) is the generally accepted location in which Harold Godwinson deployed his army for the Battle of Hastings on 14 October 1066. It is located near what is now the town of Battle, East Sussex. The name Senlac was popularised by the Victorian historian E. A. Freeman, based solely on a description of the battle by the Anglo-Norman chronicler Orderic Vitalis. Freeman went on to suggest that the Normans nicknamed the area Blood lake as a pun on the English Sand lake.

It is probable that Orderic would have known the English name for Senlac, as he spent his early life in England since he had been born to an English mother. His  education, towards the end of his time in England, was from an English monk. However, Freeman's hypothesis has been criticised by other historians since it relies purely on the evidence from  Orderic Vitalis. Orderic was born nine years after the Battle of Hastings, and earlier chroniclers did not use the name Senlac.

Origin
The name Senlac was introduced into English history by the Victorian historian E.A. Freeman, whose only source for it was the Anglo-Norman chronicler Orderic Vitalis. Freeman suggested that Senlac was the correct name of the Battle of Hastings site since the name of the hill was Senlac and was near a stream that was called Santlache. Orderic described Harold's forces as assembling for the battle ad locum, qui Senlac antiquitus vocabatur and the battle itself as being fought  in campo Senlac.

Blood lake
Orderic was born in Atcham, Shropshire, England, the eldest son of a French priest, Odeler of Orléans and an English mother. When Orderic was five, his parents sent him to an English monk with the name of Siward, who kept a school in the Abbey of SS Peter and Paul, at Shrewsbury.

Although Orderic moved to a monastery in Normandy at the age of ten, he seems to have maintained his links with England. Freeman concluded that it was perfectly possible for Orderic to have known the English name of the ridge. The Chronicle of Battle Abbey described what it called Malfosse, a large ditch that opened up during the course of the battle (some sources say after the battle) in which many soldiers of both sides fell and were trampled to death, the result being "rivulets of blood as far as one could see". In fact, there was a local legend that was maintained for centuries after the battle that the soil in the area turned red after a heavy rainfall.

{{poemquote|.."Asten once distained with native English blood;
Whose soil, when yet but wet with any little rain,
Doth blush, as put in mind of those there sadly slain,
When Hastings' harbour gave unto the Norman powers.
Whose name and honours now are denizened for ours.
That boding, ominous brook !"<small>From Michael Drayton's Poly-Olbion 1612Drayton. Taken from the 17th Song of Poly-Olbion from the complete works. p. 229. Retrieved 24 November 2014</small>}}

Freeman suggested that Senlac meant Sand Lake in Old English, with the Norman conquerors calling it in French Sanguelac. Freeman regarded that use as a pun because the English translation of Sanguelac is "Blood Lake".

The name "Senlac"

Several historians disagreed with the Freeman analysis. John Horace Round published his "Feudal England: Historical Studies on the XIth and XIIth Centuries" in 1895 in which he strongly criticised the Freeman view. He pointed out that Senlac was not an English word and was simply a fad, if not an invention of Orderic Vitalis.

The Norman chroniclers William of Jumièges and William of Poitiers, who were contemporary with the battle, did not record the site of the battle as Senlac, and the Chronicle of Battle Abbey simply recorded the location in Latin as Bellum (Battle).Searle. The Chronicle of Battle Abbey. pp. 34-35

Later documents, however, indicate that the abbey had a tract of land known as Santlache (Sandlake) with the name Sandlake continuing for several centuries as a tithing in Battle.Harris. Battle: Historic Character Assessment Report. pp. 15-17Searle. The Chronicle of Battle Abbey. pp. 62-65

Etymology
Freeman considered what Orderic Vitalis called the battlefield, Senlac, may have been a corruption of the original Anglo-Saxon name. Other scholars have suggested that the Anglo-Saxon form would have been scen-leag meaning "beautiful meadow".Stephen Charnock. On certain Geographical Names in the County of Sussex in Report of the forty second meeting  British Association for the Advancement of Science. p. 177 Retrieved 23 November 2014 A further possibility of Senlac comes from the iron rich sandstone deposits within the local area and the local Wealden iron industry  that started before the Roman invasion and carried until the late 1700's. Some  have posited that the original  Saxon name could also  have been Isen-Lacu'', which means "iron pond".  It is possible that the meaning was changed when translated into Latin. The argument goes that if  the original name was Iron Pond, then the accepted location for  Senlac Hill is wrong.

Notes

Citations

References

External link
 Time Team. 1066: The Lost Battlefield. Programme on alternative location for battle site.

Hills of East Sussex
1066 in England
History of East Sussex
Norman conquest of England
Registered historic battlefields in England
William the Conqueror
History of Sussex